Chinguetué is a Chilean area located in Valdivia, Valdivia Province, Los Ríos Region. It was described in 1899 by Francisco Solano Asta-Buruaga y Cienfuegos on his book Diccionario Geográfico de la República de Chile as a "very productive area". Chinguetué means "land of chingues".

References

Populated places in Valdivia Province